A civil list is a list of individuals to whom money is paid by the government, typically for service to the state or as honorary pensions. It is a term especially associated with the United Kingdom and its former colonies of Canada, India, New Zealand, Singapore and many more. It was originally defined as expenses supporting the monarch.

United Kingdom
In the United Kingdom, the Civil List was, until 2011, the annual grant that covered some expenses associated with the Sovereign performing their official duties, including those for staff salaries, state visits, public engagements, ceremonial functions and the upkeep of the Royal Households. The cost of transport and security for the Royal Family, together with property maintenance and other sundry expenses, were covered by separate grants from individual government departments. The Civil List was abolished under the Sovereign Grant Act 2011.

History
Following the Glorious Revolution of 1688, the expenses relating to the support of the monarch were largely separated from the ordinary expenses of the state managed by the Exchequer. 

In 1697, Parliament under William III fixed the Crown's peacetime revenue at £1,200,000 per year; of this about £700,000 was appropriated towards the Civil List. The sovereigns were expected to use this to defray some of the costs of running the civil government (such as the Civil Service, judges' and ambassadors' salaries) and the payment of pensions, as well as the expenses of the Royal Household and the sovereign's personal expenses. It was from this that the term "Civil List" arose, to distinguish it from the statement of military and naval expenses which were funded through special taxation.

The accession of George III in 1760 marked a significant change in royal finances. As his predecessor, George II, had failed to meet all of the specific costs of the civil government in accordance with the previous arrangement, it was decided by the Civil List Act 1760 that George III would surrender the hereditary revenues from the Crown Estate to Parliament for the duration of his reign, and in return Parliament would assume responsibility for most of the costs of the civil government. Parliament would continue to pay the Civil List, which would defray the expenses of the Royal Household and some of the costs of the civil government. George III, however, retained the income from the Duchy of Lancaster.

On the accession of William IV in 1830, the sum voted for the Civil List was restricted to the expenses of the Royal Household, removing any residual responsibilities associated with the cost of the civil government.  This finally removed any links between the Sovereign and the cost of the civil government. On the accession of Queen Victoria, the Civil List Act 1837—which reiterated the principles of the civil list system and specified all prior Acts as in force—was passed. Upon the accession of subsequent monarchs down to Queen Elizabeth II, this constitutional arrangement was confirmed, but the historical term "Civil List" remained even though the grant had nothing to do with the expenses of the civil government.

In 1931 George V decided to eschew the £50,000 due to him from the Civil List as a result of the Great Depression. As Keeper of the Privy Purse, Sir Frederick Ponsonby wrote to Prime Minister Ramsay MacDonald to say that George had felt it was possible to reject the grant by "exercise of the most rigid economy" and that Queen Mary and other royal family members were "desirous that reductions in these grants should be made during this time of national crisis".

Elizabeth II
The last British monarch to receive Civil List payments was Elizabeth II. The Civil List for her reign lasted from her accession in 1952 until its abolition in 2012. During this period the Queen, as head of state, used the Civil List to defray some of the official expenditure of the monarchy.

Only the Queen, the Duke of Edinburgh and the Queen Mother ever received direct funding from the Civil List. The Prince of Wales and his immediate family (the Duchess of Cornwall, the Duke and Duchess of Cambridge, and Prince Harry) received their income from the Duchy of Cornwall. The state duties and staff of other members of the Royal Family were funded from a parliamentary annuity, the amount of which was fully refunded by the Queen to the Treasury. The Queen's consort (Prince Philip, Duke of Edinburgh) received £359,000 per year. 

The last two decades of the Civil List were marked by surpluses and deficits. Surpluses in the 1991–2000 Civil List caused by low inflation and the efforts of the Queen and her staff to make the Royal Household more efficient led to the accrual of a £35.3 million reserve by late 2000. Consequently, the Civil List was fixed at £7.9 million annually in 2001, the same amount as in 1991, and remained at that level until its abolition. The reserve was then used to make up the shortfall in the Civil List during the subsequent decade. The Civil List Act 1972 allowed the Treasury to review the level of the payment every ten years, but only allowed for increases and not reductions.

The abolition of the Civil List was announced in the spending review statement to the House of Commons on 20 October 2010 by the Chancellor of the Exchequer, George Osborne. In its place, he said, "the Royal Household will receive a new Sovereign Support Grant linked to a portion of the revenue of the Crown Estate". The Crown Estate is a statutory corporation, run on commercial lines by the Crown Estate Commissioners and generates revenue for HM Treasury every year (an income surplus of £210.7 million for the year ended 31 March 2010). This income is received by the Crown and given to the state as a result of the agreement reached in 1760 that has been renewed at the beginning of each subsequent reign. The Sovereign Grant Act 2011 received royal assent on 18 October 2011. Under this Act, the Sovereign Grant now funds all of the official expenditure of the monarchy, not just the expenditure previously borne by the Civil List.

Civil List pensions

These are pensions traditionally granted by the Sovereign from the Civil List upon the recommendation of the First Lord of the Treasury. The Civil List Act 1837 applied the condition that any new pensions should be "granted to such persons only as have just claims on the royal beneficence or who by their personal services to the Crown, or by the performance of duties to the public, or by their useful discoveries in science and attainments in literature and the arts, have merited the gracious consideration of their sovereign and the gratitude of their country." Famous recipients include William Wordsworth, William Barnes, Geraldine Jewsbury, Margaret Oliphant, Christopher Logue, and Molly Parkin. (Lord Byron is often said to have received a civil list pension, but his mother was the actual recipient.) As of 1911, a sum of £1,200 was allotted each year from the Civil List, in addition to the pensions already in force. From a Return issued in 1908, the total of Civil List pensions payable in that year amounted to £24,665. In the financial year 2012-13 the annual cost of Civil List pensions paid to 53 people was £126,293. New Civil List pensions continue to be awarded occasionally.

Canada

In Canada the civil list was a common term during the pre-confederation period; it referred to the payment for all officials on the government payroll.  There was much controversy as to whether the list would be controlled by the governor or by the Legislative Assembly.  The Assembly demanded control of all money matters, while the governors worried that if the Assembly was given this power, then certain positions would be delisted.  Eventually under the Baldwin-Lafontaine government, a compromise was reached with Lord Elgin.

The term civil list is no longer commonly used to describe the payment of civil servants in Canada, who are covered in the budgets of executive agencies.

India
Civil Services of India civil servant bureaucrats, in a personal capacity, are paid from the Civil List. Senior civil servants may be called to account by Parliament. The civil service system in India is rank-based and does not follow the tenets of the position-based civil services.

Morocco
Article 45 of the 2011 Amended Moroccan Constitution states that the King shall have a civil list. A similar provision was contained in Article 22 of the 1996 Amended Moroccan Constitution.

New Zealand

The New Zealand Constitution Act 1852 (an enactment of the Parliament of the United Kingdom) granted self-government to the Colony of New Zealand and made provision for sums payable to the Monarch. Various Civil List enactments were passed, repealed and replaced over the next hundred years which provided for permanent appropriations of Parliament to fund to the Governor-General, Prime Minister, Cabinet Ministers, Members of Parliament and the judiciary. The Civil List Act 1950 provided for salaries and allowances of members of Parliament to be fixed by Order in Council on the recommendation of a Royal Commission, where previously they had been set at intervals by legislation, and also codified the convention that a Minister of the Crown must be a member of Parliament. It was amended in 1964 to provide for an annuity for former Prime Ministers and the widows of former Prime Ministers.

The Civil List Act 1979, succeeding the 1950 Act, was the final enactment of that name. It provided for a Higher Salaries Commission (now known as the Remuneration Authority), an independent salary-setting body for public offices including judges. A standalone Higher Salaries Commission Act 1977 extracted the Commission from the Civil List Act. Some parts of the Act were also rehomed into the Constitution Act 1986. A review of the Civil List Act 1979 was undertaken by the Law Commission from 2007 to 2010; eventually the Act was repealed in two stages. The provisions relating to the Governor-General were repealed and replaced by the Governor-General Act 2010 and the remaining provisions were repealed and replaced by the Members of Parliament (Remuneration and Services) Act 2013.

Singapore
The Civil List and Gratuity Act provides a civil list and gratuity for the maintenance of the President of Singapore.

See also 
 Privy Purse
 Privy Purse in India

References

Citations

Further reading
 President of Singapore's Salary and Entitlements President of Singapore#Salary and entitlements

External links 

 BBC Royal Accounts 2002
The price of monarchy: two pints of milk (Stephen Bates, Guardian, 25 June 2004)
Royal financial reports 2003/2004 (royal.gov.uk)
Civil List (royal.gov.uk)

British monarchy
Government finances
Monarchy and money